Nineli Vakula is a Soviet sprint canoer who competed in the early 1970s. She was born in Gomel. She won a gold medal in the K-4 500 m event at the 1970 ICF Canoe Sprint World Championships in Copenhagen.

References

Living people
Sportspeople from Gomel
Soviet female canoeists
Year of birth missing (living people)
Belarusian female canoeists
ICF Canoe Sprint World Championships medalists in kayak
Honoured Masters of Sport of the USSR